Ann Catherine Stewart James  (born 6 October 1952) is an Australian illustrator of more than 60 children's books, some of which she also wrote. She was born in Melbourne, Victoria. James has been illustrating books since the 1980s and has become a significant contributor towards the development and appreciation of children's literature in Australia. In 2000 she was awarded the Pixie O'Harris Award as a formal acknowledgment of this contribution and was also the 2002 recipient of the national Dromkeen Medal for services towards children's literature. Ann James currently still lives and works in Melbourne, where she runs the Books Illustrated gallery and studio that she co-founded with Ann Haddon in 1988.

Biography
Ann James was born in Melbourne, Australia, in October 1952, and grew up in the suburb of Ringwood. She attended Norwood Primary School and Tintern Girls School. Later she earned the Higher Diploma at Melbourne Teachers College. Trained as an arts and crafts teacher, she taught at both Doveton and Ringwood High School in Melbourne, then worked in publications for the Ministry of Education in Victoria. It was here that she began to work as a graphic designer and illustrator of educational publications between 1978 and 1988.

During this time James began freelance illustration of children's books, beginning with A Pet for Mrs Arbuckle, written by Gwenda Smyth, which they entered in a 1981 competition for unpublished writers and illustrators. As her career in books began to take off, (with 14 books published by 1988), James left the Department of Education and co-founded a gallery named Books Illustrated, dedicated to children's book illustration. From this time onwards she has worked towards promoting Australian Children's books, and continued illustrating books from her home in Melbourne, and her country studio, near Castlemaine, Victoria.

Career
Many of James's books have won or been short-listed for the Children's Book Council of Australia book of the year awards, including Bernice Knows Best, by Max Dann, (CBCA Junior Book of the Year, 1984) and Hannah Plus One by Libby Gleeson which won the same award in 1997. Also in 1997, The Midnight Gang, by Margaret Wild, was a CBCA Picture Book of the Year Honor book, and went on to win three Children's Choice awards around Australia. Books short-listed in the CBCA Awards included Dog In, Cat Out, by Gillian Rubinstein; Hannah and the Tomorrow Room, by Libby Gleeson; Looking Out for Sampson, by Libby Hathorn; and Penny Pollard’s Diary and Penny Pollard’s Letters by Robin Klein.

In 1988 Ann James co founded a gallery and studio space in Melbourne called Books Illustrated with fellow book enthusiast Ann Haddon. This gallery has become a center for children's literature and children's book illustration and has exhibited the work of many prominent Australian illustrators including, Terry Denton, Shaun Tan and Leigh Hobbs.

Ann James's illustrative work is part of the permanent collections of the Lu Rees Archives at University of Canberra, the Dromkeen Collection, Fremantle Children's Literature Centre, Seasons Gallery, and the Customs House Gallery.

James was awarded Member of the Order of Australia in the Australia Day 2016 Honours List "for significant service to children's literature as an author and illustrator, and through advocacy roles with literacy and professional bodies".

Books
 A Pet for Mrs Arbuckle, Gwenda Smyth, Thomas Nelson, 1981
 Jo Jo and Mike, Jenny Wagner, Thomas Nelson, 1982
 Bernice Knows Best, Max Dann, 1983 *** (Younger Readers section)
  Penny Pollard's Diary, Robin Klein, Oxford University Press, 1983 (Hodder Headline)
 The ABC of What You Can Be, Sugar & Snails Press, 1984
 Where's my Shoe?, Hazel Edwards, Longman Cheshire, 1984
 Snakes & Ladders, Robin Klein, Dent, 1984 (Allen & Unwin)
 Penny Pollard's Letters, Robin Klein, 1984 (Hodder Headline)
 Dangers and Disasters, various authors, Methuen, 1986
 Penny Pollard in Print, Robin Klein, Oxford University Press, 1986 (Hodder Headline)
 Looking Out for Sampson, Libby Hathorn, Oxford University Press, 1987 (Hodder Headline)
 Sportsmad, Hazel Edwards, Longman, 1987
 Penny Pollard's Passport, Robin Klein, Oxford University Press, 1988 (Hodder Headline)
 Wiggy and Boa, Anna Fienberg, Houghton Mifflin, 1988 (Allen and Unwin)
 A Hobby for Mrs Arbuckle, Gwenda Smyth, Viking, 1989 (reissue, new format)
 One Day: a very first Dictionary, Oxford University Press, 1989 (Hodder Headline)
  Prince Lachlan, Nette Hilton, Omnibus Books, 1989
  Penny Pollard's Guide to Modern Maners, Robin Klein, 1989 (Hodder Headline)
 Beryl & Bertha at the Beach, Pippa MacPherson, Oxford University Press, 1990
 Amy the Indefatigable Autograph Hunter, Judith Worthy, Angus & Robertson, 1990
 First at Last, Julia McClelland, Oxford University Press, 1990 (Hodder Headline)
 Dial-a-Croc, Mike Dumbleton, Omnibus Books 1991
 Dog In, Cat Out, Gillian Rubinstein, Omnibus Books, 1991
  The Ding Dong Daily, Kathleen Hill, Heineman, 1991
 The Ding Dong Daily Extra, Kathleen Hill, Heineman, 1992
 The Backsack Bulletin, Rod Quantock, Mammoth, 1992
 Tangles, Errol Broome, Allen & Unwin, 1993
 Rockhopper, Errol Broome, Allen & Unwin, 1994
 Snap!, Margaret Ballinger, Houghton Mifflin (US), 1994
 Jessica Joan, Wendy Orr, Heineman, 1994
 Skating on Sand, Libby Gleeson, Penguin, 1994
 Madeline the Mermaid and other Fishy Tales, Anna Fienberg, Allen & Unwin, 1995
 The Butterfly, Roger Vaughan Carr, Random House, 1996
 Making Pictures: techniques for illustrating Children's Books, Ann Haddon, Scholastic 1996
 Hannah Plus One, Libby Gleeson, Penguin, 1996
 Dead Sailors don't Bite, Anna Fienberg. Little Ark, 1996
 The Midnight Gang, Margaret Wild, Omnibus, 1996
 Pidge, Krista Bell, Allen & Unwin, 1997
 Dog Star, Janeen Brian, Omnibus Books, 1997
 After Dusk, Ted Greenwood, Penguin, 1997
 A Coat of Cats, Jeri Kroll, Lothian Books, 1998
 Elephant's Lunch, Kate Walker, Omnibus Books, 1998
 Magnus Maybe, Errol Broome, Allan & Unwin, 1998
 Lizzy & Smiley, Julia McClelland, Penguin, 1999
 The Midnight Feast, Margaret Wild, ABC Books, 1999
 Penny Pollard's Scrapbook, Robin Klein, Hodder Headline, 1999
 Penny Pollard's Diary, Robin Klein, Hodder Headline, 1999 (reissue, new format)
 Penny Pollard's Passport, Robin Klein, Hodder Headline, 1999 (reissue, new format)
 Penny Pollard in Print, Robin Klein, Hodder Headline, 1999 (reissue, new format)
 Penny Pollard's Letters, Robin Klein, Hoddet Headline, 1999 (reissue, new format)
 Penny Pollard's Guide to Modern Manners, Robin Klein, Hodde Headline, 1999 (reissue, new format)
 Hannah & the Tomorrow Room, Libby Gleeson, Penguin, 1999
 Baby, Tania Cox, Working Titles Press, 2000
 Missing Mem, Errol Broome, Allen & Unwin, 2000
 Jessica Joan, Wendy Orr, Koala Books (reissue, new format, new publisher), 2000
 The Mermaid's Tail, Raewyn Caisley, Penguin Books, 2001
 Shutting the Chooks In, Libby Gleeson, Scholastic, 2003
 Shoo Cat, Ian Bone, Omnibus Books, 2003
 Little Humpty, Margaret Wild, Little Hare Books, 2003
 Jessie & Mr Smith, Jane Godwin, Penguin, 2003
 Hannah the Famous, Libby Gleeson, Penguin Books, 2004
 The Way I Love You, David Bedford, Little Hare Books, 2004
 Muscles, Hazel Edwards, Lothian Books, 2005
 Tai's Penguin, Raewyn Caisley, Penguin Books, 2006
 Ready, Set, Skip!, Jane O'Connor, Penguin Books, US, 2007. Penguin Books Australia, 2007
 Lucy Goosey, Margaret Wild, Little Hare Books, October 2007
 Audrey of the Outback, Christine Harris, Little Hare Books, 2008
 Audrey Goes to Town, Christine Harris, Little Hare Books, 2008
 Sadie & Ratz, Sonya Hartnett, Penguin Books, 2008
 I'm A Dirty Dinosaur, Janeen Brian, Penguin Books, 2013 
 I’m A Hungry Dinosaur, Janeen Brian, Penguin Books, 2015

See also

References

External links 
 James at Libraries Australia Authorities with catalogue search 
  (1983–2013)

1952 births
Living people
Australian children's book illustrators
Australian children's writers
Artists from Melbourne
Australian women illustrators
Members of the Order of Australia